James Charles Bellwood  (10 July 1912 – 19 July 1994) was a New Zealand labourer, physical education instructor and sports coach.

He was born in Hastings, New Zealand, as James Charles Robertson, but was fostered by Arthur and Ada Bellwood in Christchurch. He was an athletics trainer and his most famous protégée was Yvette Williams.

In the 1984 Queen's Birthday Honours, Bellwood was appointed a Member of the Order of the British Empire, for services to athletics.

References

1912 births
1994 deaths
New Zealand educators
New Zealand Members of the Order of the British Empire
People from Hastings, New Zealand
Ngāi Tahu people